Smith's wrinkled frog (Alcalus tasanae), commonly known as Tasan eastern frog, Tasan frog, or Tha san frog,) is a species of frog in the family Dicroglossidae. It is found in western and southern Thailand; its range likely extends to Myanmar but it has not yet been recorded there.
Its natural habitats are primary rainforests near streams. It is threatened by habitat loss.

References

Alcalus
Amphibians of Thailand
Endemic fauna of Thailand
Amphibians described in 1921
Taxonomy articles created by Polbot